Bleeke Bet can refer to:

 Bleeke Bet (1923 film), a 1923 Dutch film
 Bleeke Bet (1934 film), a 1934 Dutch film